Brewton Municipal Airport  is a city-owned public-use airport located  south of the central business district of Brewton, a city in Escambia County, Alabama, United States. Originally constructed by the U.S. Navy during World War II as an auxiliary field to the Naval Air Station Pensacola complex, it was later redesignated as Navy Outlying Landing Field (NOLF) Brewton before being conveyed to the city of Brewton as a public use facility.  Although under civilian ownership, the airfield still functions concurrently as NOLF Brewton and is used by Navy training aircraft located at Naval Air Station Whiting Field, Florida.  

According to the FAA's National Plan of Integrated Airport Systems for 2009–2013, it is categorized as a general aviation facility.

Facilities and aircraft 
For the 12-month period ending June 29, 2007 the airport had 165,500 general aviation/military aircraft operations.

References

External links 
 

Airports in Alabama
Transportation buildings and structures in Escambia County, Alabama